Michael Leslie Winslow (born September 6, 1958) is an American actor, comedian and beatboxer billed as The Man of 10,000 Sound Effects for his ability to make realistic sounds using only his voice. He is best known for his roles in all seven Police Academy films as Larvell Jones. He has also appeared in Spaceballs, Cheech and Chong's Next Movie and Nice Dreams, The Love Boat, and commercials for Cadbury and GEICO.

Early life
Winslow was born in Spokane, Washington, the son of Verdie and Robert Winslow. He grew up at Fairchild Air Force Base near Spokane, and later attended the Lisa Maile School of Acting, Modeling and Imaging.

According to his own account, Winslow had few friends growing up. To pass time, he would imitate the sounds of engines, animals, flatulence, anything that made noise. Following high school and college he performed in nightclubs and theaters, where his sound imitation skills won him positive appraisal and enough money to move to and perform his act in Hollywood.

Career
His first television appearance was on The Gong Show in which he squeezed in sound-alikes of Benji the movie dog, Star Trek, and Jimi Hendrix's "Purple Haze".  He is best known for his role as Larvell Jones in the Police Academy series of movies and TV shows. He was cast in the role after he was seen opening for Count Basie. In 1985, Island Records released a 12" of Michael Winslow entitled "I Am My Own Walkman". The song peaked at number 60 in Australia.

In 1986, Winslow presented the Best Sound Effects Editing Oscar to Charles L. Campbell and Robert Rutledge for their work on Back to the Future.

In 1987, Winslow appeared as a radar operator in the movie Spaceballs, in which he performs all the sound effects himself during one scene. Mel Brooks (who wrote, directed, produced, and co-starred in the film) stated that, by doing so, Winslow saved the film money. Winslow is also a motivational speaker. Since the fall of 2008, Winslow has hosted the motion-picture television series called "Way Back Wednesday with Winslow" on the cable superstation WGN America, which features movies mostly released in the 1980s. He continues to perform stand-up comedy around the globe.

Michael Winslow debuted his own iPhone and iPod Touch apps in 2010, bringing his sound effects and comedy to a mobile platform. ThatsKungFu generates Winslow's kung fu fighting sounds when the device is swung in a fighting motion. NoizeyMan, billed as the "World's Noiziest App", contains video, ringtones, sound effects, and mini games, all created by Winslow.

In 2011, Winslow worked with Orlando, Florida-based game development studio Phyken Media on a mobile game for iOS and Android platforms entitled Wizard Ops Chapter 1, providing all the sound effects for the game. He also lent his voice on Wizard Ops Tactics, a turn-based tactical game and spiritual successor to the previous game.

He was also featured in a commercial for GEICO Insurance during their "we hired a celebrity" ad campaign.

In 2020, Winslow guest starred on the Dropout.tv show "Game Changer" as a substitute for Zachary Oyama. He won Episode 10 of Season 3, and the episode aired on the twenty-second of January 2021.

In 2021, Winslow auditioned for the sixteenth season of America's Got Talent. Following the airing of his audition, he had a guest appearance on the Talent Recap Show where he showed viewers how to make some of his most signature noises. Winslow was eliminated during the semi-finals.

In 2022, Winslow was heavily featured in a videogamedunkey YouTube video entitled Video Game Sound. This video brought Winslow's work to a broad audience of video game fans. Videogamedunkey has talked about Winslow since the start of his channel, seemingly being a fan.

Filmography

Cheech & Chong's Next Movie (1980) as Welfare Comedian
Underground Aces (1981) as Nate
Nice Dreams (1981) as Superman Nut
Space Stars (1981) as Plutem (voice)
Tag: The Assassination Game (1982) as Gowdy
Heidi's Song (1982) as Mountain (voice)
Police Academy (1984) as Cadet Larvell Jones
Alphabet City (1984) as Lippy
Gremlins (1984) as Mogwai / Gremlins (voice)
Grandview, U.S.A. (1984) as Spencer
Lovelines (1984) as J.D
Police Academy 2: Their First Assignment (1985) as Officer Larvell Jones
Starchaser: The Legend of Orin (1985) (voice)
Police Academy 3: Back in Training (1986) as Sgt. Larvell Jones
Police Academy 4: Citizens on Patrol (1987) as Sgt. Larvell Jones
Spaceballs (1987) as Radar Technician
 (West Germany, 1987) as Walker
Police Academy 5: Assignment Miami Beach (1988) as Sgt. Larvell Jones
Starke Zeiten (West Germany, 1988) as Mike
Buy & Cell (1988) as Sly
 (West Germany, 1988) as Ronny
Police Academy 6: City Under Siege (1989) as Sgt Larvell Jones
Think Big (1989) as Hap
New Kids on the Block (1990, TV series) (voice)
Far Out Man (1990) as Airport Cop
Going Under (1990) as Reporter
Extralarge (1993, TV series) (with Bud Spencer) as Dumas
Police Academy: Mission to Moscow (1994) as Sgt Larvell Jones
Be Cool about Fire Safety (1995, TV)
Police Academy: The Series TV Series (1997–1998) as Sgt. Larvelle Jones
Lycanthrope (1999) as Lee Davis
Michael Winslow Live (1999) as Michael Winslow
The Blur of Insanity (1999) as Horner's Friend 2
He Outta Be Committed (2000) as Jeremy
The Trumpet of the Swan (2001) as Chief (voice)
The Biggest Fan (2002) as Officer Man
Grand Theft Auto: San Andreas (2004) as Pedestrian (voice)
Lenny the Wonder Dog (2005) as John Wyndham
Robot Chicken (2006) as Sgt. Larvell Jones
The Great Buck Howard (2008) as Michael Winslow
Redirecting Eddie (2008) as Vaughn 
RoboDoc (2009) as Dr. Murphy
The History of the Typewriter recited by Michael Winslow (2010) as Himself
Tosh.0 (2010) as Himself
Blunt Movie (2013) as Coach Al Jefferson
Gingerclown (2013) as Stomachcrumble
Late Night with Jimmy Fallon (July 29, 2013, Comedy Sketch: The Michael Winslow Car Alarm & Musical Sit-In Guest) as Himself
Sharknado 3: Oh Hell No! (2015) as Brian Jonesy Jones
Lavalantula (2015) as Marty
Enter the Fist and the Golden Fleece (2016) as The Argonaut
Characterz (2016) as Police Detective
2 Lava 2 Lantula (2016) as Marty
The Jack and Triumph Show (2015) as Himself
Renaissance Man (2016) as Mike
Hospital Arrest (2016) as Judge Collaway
Killing Hasselhoff (2017) as Himself
Game Changer (2020) as himself (season 3)
America's Got Talent (2021) as Himself (season 16)
Todd (2021) as Jake
Video Game Sound (2022) as Himself

References

External links
 
 Agency profile
 
 Interview with Heeb Magazine, August 2009

1958 births
20th-century American comedians
21st-century American comedians
20th-century African-American people
Living people
American male film actors
African-American male comedians
American male comedians
American male voice actors
Male actors from Spokane, Washington
African-American male actors
American male television actors
America's Got Talent contestants